Ring-opening metathesis polymerization (ROMP) is a type of olefin metathesis chain-growth polymerization.  The driving force of the reaction is relief of ring strain in cyclic olefins (e.g. norbornene or cyclopentene). A variety of heterogeneous and homogeneous catalysts have been developed. Most large-scale commercial processes rely on the former while some fine chemical syntheses rely on the homogeneous catalysts. Catalysts are based on transition metals such as W, Mo, Re, Ru, and Ti.

Heterogeneous catalysis and applications

Ring-opening metathesis polymerization of cycloalkenes has been commercialized since the 1970s.  Examples of polymers produced on an industrial level through ROMP catalysis are Vestenamer or trans-polyoctenamer, which is the metathetical polymer of cyclooctene. Norsorex or polynorbornene is another important ROMP product on the market. Telene and Metton are polydicyclopentadiene products produced in a side reaction of the polymerization of norbornene.

The ROMP process is useful because a regular polymer with a regular amount of double bonds is formed.  The resulting product can be subjected to partial or total hydrogenation, or can be functionalized into more complex compounds.

Homogeneous catalysts

The most common homogeneous catalyst for ROMP is also the best understood. In particular, the third generation Grubbs' catalyst (known as G3) has excellent functional group tolerance, air-stability, and fast initiation and propagation rates. The fast initiation rates of G3 results in a living polymerization with a narrow polymer molecular weight dispersion. This has made ROMP a popular choice for making advanced polymer architectures and functional polymer products. It is common to quench these reactions with ethyl vinyl ether to generate the free polymer chain and an inactive Ru Fischer carbene complex.

Mechanism
The mechanism of ROMP is similar to any olefin metathesis reaction. Initiation occurs by formation of an open coordination site. Propagation occurs via a metallacyclobutane intermediate.

Frontal ring-opening metathesis polymerization
Frontal ring-opening metathesis polymerization (FROMP) is a variation of ROMP in which it is a latent polymerization system that react fast, only upon ignition. One example of this system is the FROMP of dicyclopentadiene with a Grubbs' catalyst initiated by heat.

See also
 Acyclic diene metathesis
 Ring-opening polymerization

References

Polymerization reactions